The Hay's Ranch Bridge, in Rio Blanco County, Colorado near Meeker, Colorado, was built in 1900–01. It was listed on the National Register of Historic Places in 1985.

It is a pin-connected, 6-panel steel Pratt pony truss bridge.  It has a single  span bringing County Road 127 over the White River.

Its steel was forged by Lackawanna and Carnegie and it was constructed by M. J. Patterson Contracting Co. of Denver.

It was documented by the Historic American Engineering Record in 1983.

References

Bridges in Colorado
National Register of Historic Places in Rio Blanco County, Colorado
Buildings and structures completed in 1901